It is the 2022–23 season of the Men's Volleyball team of Galatasaray Sports Club.

Overview

June
On 21 June 2022, Galatasaray Men's Volleyball team manager Hüseyin Koç said goodbye to Galatasaray with a post he shared on his social media account.

On 24 June 2022, the roads were separated by mutual agreement with Nedim Özbey, Head Coach of Galatasaray Men's Volleyball Team.

On 25 June 2022, Umut Çakır, who has been working as an assistant coach at Galatasaray since 2015, has been appointed as the head coach of the Galatasaray Men's Volleyball Team.

August
On 5 August 2022, Mehmetcan Şamlı was appointed as the Men's Volleyball Team Manager.

Osman Çakıray was appointed as the assistant coach of the Men's Volleyball Team on 9 August 2022.

On 10 August 2022, Yalçın Ayhan became the physiotherapist of the Men's Volleyball Team.

The fixtures of the AXA Sigorta Efeler League for the 2022–23 volleyball season were determined with the drawing of lots held at the Ankara Headquarters of the Turkish Volleyball Federation on August 12, 2022.

Sponsorship and kit manufacturers

Supplier: Umbro
Name sponsor: HDI Sigorta
Main sponsor: HDI Sigorta
Back sponsor: Tunç Holding

Sleeve sponsor: —
Lateral sponsor: —
Short sponsor: —
Socks sponsor: —

Technical Staff

Team roster

Transfers

New contracts

In

Out

Pre-season and friendlies

|}

Competitions

Turkish Men's Volleyball League (AXA Sigorta Efeler Ligi)

League table

Regular season (1st Half)
All times are Europe Time (UTC+03:00).																						

|}

Regular season (2nd Half)
All times are Europe Time (UTC+03:00).																						

|}

Turkish Men's Volleyball Cup (AXA Sigorta Kupa Voley)

Group C

|}

Results
All times are Europe Time (UTC+03:00).																						

|}

Quarter-finals
All times are Europe Time (UTC+03:00).																						

|}

CEV Cup

16th Finals

|}

8th Finals

|}

Playoffs

|}

References

External links
 Official Galatasaray Volleyball Branch Website 
 Official Twitter Account of Galatasaray Sports Club Volleyball Branch 
 Galatasaray Istanbul » rosters __ Volleybox 
 Turkish Volleyball Federastion Official Website 

Galatasaray S.K. (men's volleyball) seasons
Galatasaray Sports Club 2022–23 season